Sulingen is a town in the district of Diepholz, Lower Saxony, Germany. It is situated approximatively 30 km east of Diepholz, and 45 km south of Bremen.

Sister cities
 Joniškis, Lithuania

People from Sulingen 
 Walter Momper (born 1945), German politician (SPD)
 Liesel Westermann (born 1944), German discus thrower

References

Towns in Lower Saxony
Diepholz (district)